Mike Lightfoot is an American retired college basketball coach known for his career at Bethel College. He was Bethel coach from 1987 to 2017. He was the fastest winning coach in college basketball history, to reach the 300, 400, and 500 win plateau. Coach Lightfoot also won more games than any other college basketball coach in the history of the state of Indiana, passing the likes of Bob Knight and Gene Keady. Lightfoot retired at the end of the 2016–17 season.  He was inducted into the NAIA Hall of Fame in 2009 with John Wooden. Coach Lightfoot currently works for Nations of Coaches as a regional director and the ACC Network as a color commentator for basketball.

Wins by a basketball coach when coaching in the state of Indiana:

Personal life

He coached both of his sons, Robbie and Ryne, at Bethel College. Robbie is the creator of Box out sports graphic and Ryne is the assistant coach for Western Carolina University. He and his wife Jacci have been married for 44 years

See also
 List of college men's basketball coaches with 600 wins

References

External links
Bethel College Hall of Fame profile

Living people
American men's basketball coaches
Bethel Pilots men's basketball coaches
Year of birth missing (living people)